Olga Dorfner (May 30, 1898 in Philadelphia – May 7, 1983) was an American competitive swimmer. In 1918 she became the first American woman to break a swimming world record; she did that in the 200 meter freestyle and 100 yard (91 m) freestyle events. In 1970 Dofner was inducted to the International Swimming Hall of Fame.

Her record in 100 yards was 1:06.2. Besides that she also held US records in the 40 yd, 50 yd, 60 yd, 80 yd and 220 yd and was a US champion in the 50 yd (1916), 100 yd (1916-1918), 220 yd (1917) yd and 440 yd (1917) freestyle events. She did not participate in Summer Olympics due to World War I, and then due to childbirth in 1920.

According to the findagrave website she was born to Anton Dorfner (1857–?) and  Emelia Valetton Dorfner (1864–1943), and married Harry E Schoenhut (October 1, 1889 – September 1, 1952) in 1919. She started swimming in a club in 1914. After winning the national championships of 1916 she was presented with a vase featuring her portrait. Dorfner personally donated the vase to the museum of the International Swimming Hall of Fame in 1970.

See also
 List of members of the International Swimming Hall of Fame

References

External links
New York Times archives search for Olga Dorfner

1983 deaths
1898 births
American female swimmers
20th-century American women